The Pxmart Headquarters is a 22-storey,  skyscraper office building completed in 2013 and located in Zhongshan District, Taipei, Taiwan. The building serves as the corporate headquarters of the Taiwanese supermarket chain PX Mart.

See also 
 List of tallest buildings in Taiwan
 List of tallest buildings in Taipei
 PX Mart

References

2013 establishments in Taiwan
Skyscraper office buildings in Taipei
Office buildings completed in 2013